John Flanders Kennedy (born August 20, 1965) is an American politician. He is a member of the Georgia State Senate from the 18th district, serving since 2015. He is a member of the Republican Party.

References

1965 births
21st-century American politicians
Georgia (U.S. state) Republicans
Living people